RapidMiner is a data science platform designed for enterprises that analyses the collective impact of organizations’ employees, expertise and data. Rapid Miner's data science platform is intended to support many analytics users across a broad AI lifecycle. It was acquired by Altair Engineering in September 2022.

History
RapidMiner, formerly known as YALE (Yet Another Learning Environment), was developed starting in 2001 by Ralf Klinkenberg, Ingo Mierswa, and Simon Fischer at the Artificial Intelligence Unit of the Technical University of Dortmund.   Starting in 2006, its development was driven by Rapid-I, a company founded by Ingo Mierswa and Ralf Klinkenberg in the same year.  In 2007, the name of the software was changed from YALE to RapidMiner. In 2013, the company rebranded from Rapid-I to RapidMiner.

Description
RapidMiner uses a client/server model with the server offered either on-premises or in public or private cloud infrastructures.

According to Bloor Research, RapidMiner provides 99% of an advanced analytical solution through template-based frameworks that speed delivery and reduce errors by nearly eliminating the need to write code. RapidMiner provides data mining and machine learning procedures including: data loading and transformation (ETL), data preprocessing and visualization, predictive analytics and statistical modeling, evaluation, and deployment. RapidMiner is written in the Java programming language. RapidMiner provides a GUI to design and execute analytical workflows. Those workflows are called “Processes” in RapidMiner and they consist of multiple “Operators”.  Each operator performs a single task within the process, and the output of each operator forms the input of the next one. Alternatively, the engine can be called from other programs or used as an API. Individual functions can be called from the command line. RapidMiner provides learning schemes, models and algorithms and can be extended using R and Python scripts.

RapidMiner functionality can be extended with additional plugins which are made available via RapidMiner Marketplace. The RapidMiner Marketplace provides a platform for developers to create data analysis algorithms and publish them to the community.

The RapidMiner Studio Free Edition, which is limited to one logical processor and 10,000 data rows, is available under the AGPL license,

Adoption
In 2019, Gartner placed RapidMiner in the leader quadrant of its Magic Quadrant for Data Science & Machine Learning Platforms for the sixth year in a row. The report noted that RapidMiner provides deep and broad modeling capabilities for automated end-to-end model development. In the 2018 annual software poll, KDnuggets readers voted RapidMiner as one of the most popular data analytics software with the poll’s respondents citing the software package as the tool they use. RapidMiner has received millions of total downloads and has over 400,000 users including BMW, Intel, Cisco, GE, and Samsung as paying customers. RapidMiner claims to be the market leader in the software for data science platforms against competitors such as SAS and IBM.

Developer
About 50 developers worldwide participate in the development of the open source RapidMiner with the majority of the contributors being employees of RapidMiner.  The company that develops RapidMiner received a $16 million Series C funding with participation from venture capital firms Nokia Growth Partners, Ascent Venture Partners, Longworth Venture Partners, Earlybird Venture Capital and OpenOcean. OpenOcean partner Michael "Monty" Widenius is a founder of MySQL.

References

External links
 

Computer vision software
Data mining and machine learning software
Research and development in Germany
Software using the GNU AGPL license
2022 mergers and acquisitions